High Street is a one-way street in Sai Ying Pun, Hong Kong, available only to minibuses and private vehicles. It connects Bonham Road in the east and Pok Fu Lam Road in the west. It runs from east to west from Western Street to Pok Fu Lam Road, and from west to east from Western Street to Bonham Road. It was originally named Fourth Street, but because the number four is commonly avoided in Chinese culture, the government changed the name to High Street.

Landmarks
Bonham Road Government Primary School, formerly the Northcote College of Education, which also had a campus at the junction of Sassoon Road and Northcote Close, Pok Fu Lam. In the early 1990s, it merged with the other colleges of education to form the Hong Kong Institute of Education in Tai Po. The Pok Fu Lam campus was taken over by the University of Hong Kong to become part of its Li Ka Shing Faculty of Medicine.
Sai Ying Pun Community Complex
King George V Memorial Park
Sai Ying Pun Market
Kau Yan Church and Kau Yan School (in English Kau Yan means Saviour).
Li Sing Primary School
Western Dental Clinic
David Trench Rehabilitation Centre (Former Upper Levels Police Station)
St. Paul's Secondary School, one of the top secondary school in Hong Kong. 

Other large apartment buildings include Hang Sing Mansion, Lai Ying Court, Wealth Building, Aspen Court, Cheong King Building, High House, Ko Chun Court, Ko Nga Court, Jade Court, and No 1 High Street.

Side roads and lanes

In addition to Western Street, High Street also crosses Centre Street, and Eastern Street. Between Centre and Eastern Streets, there are two laneways for pedestrians, Leung I Fong down to Third Street, and West End Path up to Bonham Road.

Businesses

Many small businesses line the central parts of High Street, and the Immanuel Social Service Centre.

See also
 List of streets and roads in Hong Kong

Sai Ying Pun
Roads on Hong Kong Island